The Benjamin Franklin Dorris House is a house located in Eugene, Oregon, listed in the National Register of Historic Places.

See also
 National Register of Historic Places listings in Lane County, Oregon

References

Houses on the National Register of Historic Places in Eugene, Oregon
Italianate architecture in Oregon